Cirimido is a comune (municipality) in the Province of Como in the Italian region Lombardy, located about  northwest of Milan and about  southwest of Como. As of 31 December 2004, it had a population of 2,052 and an area of 2.6 km².

Cirimido borders the following municipalities: Fenegrò, Guanzate, Lomazzo, Turate.

Demographic evolution

References

External links
 www.comune.cirimido.co.it

Cities and towns in Lombardy